Josip Lovrić (born September 13, 1968) was a Bosnian-Herzegovinian professional basketball player who last played for HKK Brotnjo Čitluk.

References

External links

1968 births
Living people
Bosnia and Herzegovina men's basketball players
Centers (basketball)
Helios Suns players